Christoforos Karagiannis (born 9 December 1999) is a Greek professional footballer who plays as a defensive midfielder for Super League 2 club Kavala.

References

1999 births
Living people
Super League Greece players
Football League (Greece) players
PAS Lamia 1964 players
Association football midfielders
Footballers from Athens
Greek footballers